This is a list of the busiest airports in South Korea by passengers / year.

At a glance

2017 final statistics

2016 final statistics

2015 final statistics

2014 final statistics

2013 final statistics

2012 final statistics

2011 final statistics

2010 final statistics

2009 final statistics

2008 final statistics

2007 final statistics

2006 final statistics

2005 final statistics

2004 final statistics

2003 final statistics

2002 final statistics

2001 final statistics

2000 final statistics

1999 final statistics

1998 final statistics

1997 final statistics

See also
 List of airports in South Korea
 List of airports by ICAO code: R#RK - South Korea

References

External links
Incheon(ICN) International Airport - Airport Traffic(Summary) 
KOREA AIRPORTS CORPORATION

Korea, South
Airports